The 1980 English cricket season was the 81st in which the County Championship had been an official competition. West Indies defeated England in the summer's Test series 1–0, rain ensuring that the other four matches were all drawn. A single Test was played between England and Australia to commemorate the centenary of the first Test played in England in 1880. The match was drawn. The County Championship was won by Middlesex.

Honours
County Championship – Middlesex
Gillette Cup – Middlesex
Sunday League – Warwickshire
Benson & Hedges Cup – Northamptonshire
Minor Counties Championship – Durham
Second XI Championship – Glamorgan II 
Wisden – Kim Hughes, Robin Jackman, Allan Lamb, Clive Rice, Vintcent van der Bijl

Test series

England vs West Indies

England was outplayed by West Indies and the margin would have been greater than 1–0 but for the weather. West Indies excelled in batting and fast bowling with Viv Richards, Desmond Haynes, Joel Garner, Andy Roberts and Michael Holding their standout performers. England's best player was Peter Willey who scored a fine century at The Oval.

England vs Australia

County Championship

Gillette Cup

Benson & Hedges Cup

Sunday League

Leading batsmen
Allan Lamb of Northamptonshire CCC topped the averages with 1797 runs @ 66.55.

Other leading batsmen were Kepler Wessels and Peter Kirsten who both averaged over 60.

Leading bowlers
Joel Garner of West Indies led the averages 13.93 and 49 wickets but the outstanding bowler of the season was Robin Jackman who took 121 wickets @ 15.40.

References

External links
 CricketArchive – season and tournament itineraries

Annual reviews
 Playfair Cricket Annual 1981
 Wisden Cricketers' Almanack 1981

English cricket seasons in the 20th century
English Cricket Season, 1980
Cricket season